Xyris ambigua, the coastal plain yelloweyed grass, is a North American species of flowering plant in the yellow-eyed-grass family. It is native to southern and eastern Mexico (Tamaulipas, Veracruz, Tabasco, Chiapas, the Yucatán), Central America (Belize, Honduras, Nicaragua), Cuba, and the southeastern and south-central United States (from Texas to Virginia inland to Tennessee and Arkansas).

Xyris ambigua is a perennial herb up to 100 cm (40 inches) tall with grass-like leaves and yellow flowers.

References

External links
photo of herbarium specimen at Missouri Botanical Garden, collected in British Honduras (Belize) in 1970

ambigua
Plants described in 1843
Flora of the Southern United States
Flora of Mexico
Flora of Cuba
Flora of Central America